Kevin Baker may refer to:

Kevin Baker (author) (born 1958), American novelist and journalist
Kevin Baker (ice hockey) (born 1979), Canadian ice hockey player
Kevin Baker, character in the 1993 science fiction novel Beggars in Spain by Nancy Kress
Kevin Baker, two characters in the Australian soap opera Home and Away

See also
Kevin Barker (born 1975), retired Major League Baseball first baseman